Bruktawit Getahun, better known by her stage name Betty G, is an Ethiopian singer and songwriter.

She initiated her career with collaborating with various artists, most notably, hip hop musician, like Nhatty Man, Henok Mehari, Jhonny Raga, and Henok Abebe. Her 2015 debut album Manew Fitsum and 2018 album Wegegta have been best selling album during 2016 and 2018.

Life and career
Bruktwait Getahun was born and raised in Addis Ababa, Ethiopia. She attended Lycée Guebre-Mariam, a French high school. She later joined the Commercial College of Addis Ababa and a French University, Universite de L"IAE Politier, via correspondence, graduating in 2009 with a dual degree in Office Management and General Management. With a music career starting humbly during her high school days, Betty G's stature has today seen her collaborate with several prominent Ethiopian artists including Teddy Afro, Zeritu Kebede, Jhonny Raga and Natnael Ayalew (Nhatty Man). On Coke Studio Africa 2017, Betty G collaborated with Cameroonian music group: X-Maleya as produced by Nigeria’s Chopstix. She sings in French, English and Amharic.

Bruktawit released her debut studio album entitled Manew Fitsum in 2015.

In 2018, Getahun released her critically acclaimed second album entitled Wegegta which earned her 6 AFRIMA nominations. The album was produced by Yamlu Molla who was also nominated for an AFRIMA Award.

She has noted that she does experiment with other genres of music such as jazz, rock, and electronic.

Betty G is a UNHCR high-profile supporter and has visited refugee camps within Ethiopia advocating for refugee'  rights, particularly women refugees' rights.

Betty G was inducted for Nobel Peace Prize 2019, an award of Prime Minister Abiy Ahmed and sung two songs "Hagere" and "Sin Jalleda".

Discography 
Studio albums

 Manew Fitsum (2015)
 Wegegta (2018)

Awards and nominations

References 

Living people
21st-century Ethiopian women singers
Year of birth missing (living people)
People from Addis Ababa
Musicians from Addis Ababa